Carl Auteried Jr. (born 31 October 1943) is an Austrian sailor. He competed in the Tempest event at the 1976 Summer Olympics.

References

External links
 

1943 births
Living people
Austrian male sailors (sport)
Olympic sailors of Austria
Soling class sailors
Sailors at the 1976 Summer Olympics – Tempest
Sportspeople from Vienna